Mamequest is the third studio album from Japanese girl group Mameshiba no Taigun. It was released on February 22, 2023, by Avex Trax. The album has ten tracks.

Track listing

Charts

References

2023 albums
Japanese-language albums
Avex Trax albums